Chililabombwe District is a district of Zambia, located in Copperbelt Province. The capital is Chililabombwe. At the 2010 Zambian Census, the district had a population of 91,833.

References

 
Districts of Copperbelt Province